Koyaga virescens is a moth of the family Noctuidae first described by Shigero Sugi in 1958. It is found in Japan and Taiwan.

The length of the forewings is 8–11 mm. The forewings are dark brown sparsely tinged with rufous and suffused with olive brown especially on medial and subterminal areas. The hindwings are white sprinkled with golden brown and with a fuscous terminal series.

References

Moths described in 1958
Acontiinae
Moths of Japan